The orders, decorations and medals of Finland form a system through which the Finnish government shows its respect to persons who have distinguished themselves on some walk of life. The legal basis of the system is the Act on the displays of public recognition (1215/1999) which grants the president the authority to issue decrees on orders, medals and titles.

The system is divided into three groups:
orders
decorations and medals
titles

Orders, decorations, and medals

Orders
There are three official Finnish orders:
The Order of the Cross of Liberty, founded in 1918
The Order of the White Rose of Finland, founded in 1919
The Order of the Lion of Finland, founded in 1941

The President of Finland is the grand master of all orders. Of the orders, the Order of the Cross of Liberty is the most distinguished and awarded the most seldom. Its decorations are awarded only for military or national defence merits, although the order is not purely military: civilians may receive decorations of the order for national defence merits. The other two orders are awarded both for civilian and military merits. The bulk of the decorations are awarded twice a year, on 4 June on the Flag Day of the Finnish Defence Forces, and on the Independence day, 6 December. In total, there are about 6.000 awards a year.

The orders of the White Rose and the Lion of Finland have a common board and chancellor, while the Order of the Cross of Liberty has a separate board and chancellor. All orders are awarded by the president of Finland.

The Order of the Cross of Liberty is always awarded "with swords" to military persons, with an additional ribbon in rosette form (see image in the beginning of the article) for combat or war-time merits. The decorations of the Order of the White Rose of Finland are awarded "with swords" only for combat merits and the decorations of the Order of the Lion of Finland  only for war-time military merits. As such merits are usually recognised by decorations of the Order of the Cross of Liberty, the awards of the Order of the White Rose of Finland "with swords" have been vanishingly rare. The decorations of the Order of the Lion of Finland were awarded "with swords" mainly for merits incurred in home front service. No awards of either order have been issued "with swords" for merits incurred after the Second World War.

Decorations and medals

The individual areas of government have usually a separate awards system designed to show respect for those persons who do not qualify for an order. Such medals are founded by a presidential decree. Most typically, they include one or two classes: a cross and a medal. Thus far, the following medals have been founded 
The medal of merit of motor transport
The medals of merit of customs service
The crosses and medals of merit of Finnish sports and culture of physical exercise
The Olympic cross (1st and 2nd class) and medal of merit
The cross and medals of merit of Finnish Red Cross
Life saving medal
The memorial medal of the "War of Liberation", i.e. to the participants of the Troops of the Republic of Finland (Whites) in the Finnish Civil War (1918)
The memorial medal of the Winter War (1939-1940)
The memorial medal of the Continuation War (1941-1944) and Lapland War (1944-1945)
Mine clearance medal
Medal for humane benevolence (Pro Benignitate Humana)
The cross of merit of the invalids of war
The cross and medal of merit of police
The cross and medal of merit of Finnish Border Guard
The badge of merit of fire prevention
The 1st and 2nd classes of the medal of merit of civil defence
The cross of merit of prison service
The cross of merit of customs service, with or without a clasp
The military merit medal
The golden medal of merit of Suomen Reserviupseeriliitto (Finnish reserve officers' association)
Guild metal of merit
The cross of merit of Reserviläisliitto – Reservin Aliupseerien Liitto (Reservists' association – Reserve NCOs' association)
The medal of merit of Insinööriupseeriliitto (Engineer Officers' association)
The medal of merit of Kadettikunta (Cadet Corps)
The medal of merit of traffic safety branch
The special medal of merit of work for working environment

In addition, there is a state decoration for 30 years of service of state. The corresponding decorations of the Central Chamber of Commerce and City of Helsinki the League of Finnish Municipalities are also approved for use with the official decorations. Other decorations of private bodies may only be used privately.

The awarding body of the medals and crosses of merits varies. Although the decorations are founded by the president, the awarding body is usually the chief of the authority in question, i.e. a minister or a high-level civil servant.

Order of precedence
The official order of precedence is:
 Grand Cross, with Collar, of the Order of the White Rose of Finland
 Grand Cross of the Order of the Cross of Liberty
 Grand Cross of the Order of the White Rose of Finland
 Grand Cross of the Order of the Lion of Finland
 Mannerheim Cross, 1st Class, of the Order of the Cross of Liberty
 Cross of Liberty, 1st Class with star
 Commander, First Class, of the Order of the White Rose of Finland
 Commander, First Class, of the Order of the Lion of Finland
 Mannerheim Cross, 2nd Class, of the Order of the Cross of Liberty
 Cross of Liberty, 1st Class
 Commander of the Order of the White Rose of Finland
 Commander of the Order of the Lion of Finland
 
 Finnish Olympic Cross of Merit, First Class
 Medal of Liberty, 1st Class with rosette, of the Order of the Cross of Liberty
 Medal of Merit in gold of the Order of the Cross of Liberty
 Cross of Mourning of the Order of the Cross of Liberty
 Medal of Mourning of the Order of the Cross of Liberty
 Cross of Liberty, 2nd Class, of the Order of the Cross of Liberty
 Cross of Liberty, 3rd Class, of the Order of the Cross of Liberty
 Cross of Liberty, 4th Class, of the Order of the Cross of Liberty, for war-time merits
 Knight, First Class, of the Order of the White Rose of Finland
 Pro Finlandia Medal of the Order of the Lion of Finland
 Badge of Merit of the Order of the White Rose of Finland
 Knight, First Class, of the Order of the Lion of Finland
 Cross of Liberty, 4th Class, of the Order of the Cross of Liberty (for peace-time merits)
 Knight of the Order of the White Rose of Finland
 Knight of the Order of the Lion of Finland
 Cross of Merit of the Order of the White Rose of Finland
 Cross of Merit of the Order of the Lion of Finland
 Cross of Merit of the Red Cross of Finland
 
 Finnish Olympic Cross of Merit, Second Class
 Medal of Liberty, 1st Class, of the Order of the Cross of Liberty
 Medal of Merit, 1st Class, of the Cross of Liberty
 Medal of Liberty, 2nd Class, of the Order of the Cross of Liberty
 Medal of Merit, 2nd Class, of the Cross of Liberty
 Memorial Medal with Rose of the War of Independence
 Medal, First Class with golden cross and clasp, of the Order of the White Rose of Finland
 Medal, First Class with clasp, of the Order of the White Rose of Finland
 Medal with clasp, of the Order of the White Rose of Finland
 
 
 
 
 First Class Medal of the Order of the White Rose of Finland with golden cross
 First Class Medal of the Order of the White Rose of Finland
 Medal of the Order of the White Rose of Finland
 
 Medal of Merit, in gold, of the Red Cross of Finland
 Medal of Merit, in silver, of the Red Cross of Finland
 Pro Benignitate Humana -medal
 Medal of Merit, in bronze, of the Red Cross of Finland
 Finnish Olympic Medal of Merit
 Cross of Merit of the War Invalides
 Cross of Merit of the Police
 Cross of Merit of the Frontier Guards
 Cross of Merit of the Fire Defence (Fire Cross)
 Cross of Merit, in gold, of the Finnish Sports
 Cross of Merit, in silver, of the Finnish Sports
 Medal of Merit, First Class with clasp, of the Civil Defence
 Medal of Merit, Second Class with clasp, of the Civil Defence
 Medal of Merit in silver with golden cross, of the Finnish Sports
 Medal of Merit First Class, of the Civil Defence
 Medal of Merit in silver, of the Finnish Sports
 Medal of Merit of the Frontier Guards
 Medal of Merit Second Class, of the Civil Defence
 Medal of Merit in bronze, of the Finnish Sports
 Cross of Merit, of the Prison Administration
 Medal of merit with clasp of customs service
 Gold Medal of Merit with clasp of the Reserve Officers Association
 Medal of Merit of the Association of the National Defence Guilds
 Medal of merit of customs service
 Cross of merit with clasp of Reservists' association
 Medal of Merit with clasp of the Association of the Warrant Officers'
 Gold Medal of Merit of the Reserve Officers Association
 Cross of merit of Reservists' association
 Medal of Merit of the Association of the Warrant Officers
 Medal of Merit of the Engineering Officers' Association
 Medal of Merit of the Cadet Corps
 The medal of merit of traffic safety branch
 The special medal of merit of work for working environment
 Medal of Merit, in gold, of the Police
 Medal of merit of motor transport
 Memorial Crosses and Memorial Medals of the War of Independence, Winter War, and Continuation War and other Crosses of Merit and Medals of Merit of patriotic activity in chronological order

Titles

Although a republic, Finland has a tradition of awarding titles for distinguished citizens. The available titles are listed in the presidential decree on titles (381/2000). The titles are classified in 16 categories of precedence. The two highest titles are valtioneuvos/statsråd (literal translation ) and vuorineuvos/bergsråd (literal translation ). The former is usually awarded to most distinguished, retired politicians, while the latter is meant for the CEOs of the largest Finnish companies. Less distinguished titles span different walks of life. Curiosities include liikenneneuvos, kotiseutuneuvos and nuorisoasiainneuvos. In total, there are about 100 different titles. A Finnish title is purely honorary, causing no responsibilities and giving no privileges. All Finnish titles are non-hereditary.

Typically, the titles are awarded by the president. There are some exceptions, however. The chief judge of a district court may award the title of herastuomari to a lay judge with a long service. The Evangelical Lutheran Church of Finland and the Finnish Orthodox Church, on the other hand, have the right to award the titles of director cantus and director musices. Yearly, the president awards over 200 titles on the advice of the titles' board. The awards take place twice a year: in March and in September.

In addition to honorary titles awarded by the President, certain honorary titles are awarded ex officio to state civil servants in leading positions. For example, the managers or section chiefs of several state research institutes automatically hold the title of professori ("professor"), if they are qualified for tenured faculty position in a university.

A stamp tax is paid for a title. The tax varies with the rank of the title and can be quite substantial for the higher titles. Customarily the organization that proposes the title pays the tax.

See also
Order of the Cross of Liberty
Order of the White Rose of Finland
Order of the Lion of Finland
List of honours of Finland awarded to heads of state and royalty

References

Further reading

External links

 The Orders of the White Rose of Finland and the Lion of Finland